Oldenburg in Holstein  is a town at the southwestern shore of the Baltic Sea. The nearest city is Lübeck. The town belongs to the (historical) region of Holstein, today in the state Schleswig-Holstein of Germany.

Oldenburg was the chief town of the Wagrians, one of the Slavic peoples that migrated as far west as the river Elbe in or after the 6th century (see Völkerwanderung), also known as Wends and Obotrites. The Obotrites were allies of Charlemagne. Emperor Otto I established the bishopric of Oldenburg under Adaldag, archbishop of Hamburg.

"the burned houses", indicating the bellicose times.

For centuries, Starigard/Oldenburg remained the Slavic competitor of Hedeby on the Baltic trade, until the counts Adolph I and Adolph II of Schauenburg and Holstein, supported by Henry the Lion, finally defeated the Wends during the first half of the 12th century.

The modern town has a partnership with Bergen auf Rügen in Mecklenburg-Vorpommern.

Notable natives of Oldenburg in Holstein
 Johann Liss (c.1590-c.1630) Baroque painter, active mainly in Venice

See also
 Curmsun Disc

References

External links

Ostholstein